The 2009 Premier League championship organized by the Football Federation of Sri Lanka, and was sponsored by Dialog Telekom. Renown SC won the championship by beating SL Air force SC. Mohamed Fazal of Renown SC is the top scorer.

Teams

Semi-finals
Renown SC 1-0 Blue Stars SC
SL Air Force SC 2-1 Don Bosco SC

Finals
Renown SC 2-2[3-1] SL Air Force SC

References
 

Sri Lanka Football Premier League seasons
1
1
Sri Lanka
Sri Lanka